Theodore Henley Jack (December 30, 1881 - September 20, 1964) was a professor, college administrator, and author. He served as president of Randolph Macon Women’s College from 1933 to 1952.

Emory University has a collection of his papers. The Los Angeles Public Library has his bookplate.

He married Alice Searcy Ashley. Mary Spencer Jack Craddock (December 12, 1912 - September 2, 2014) was one of their two daughters.

Writings
Sectionalism and Party Politics in Alabama (1816-1842), George Banta Pub. Co., Menasha, Wisconsin 1919
The Story of America for Young Americans Part 1 by Smith Burnham and Theodore Henley Jack 1932
America Our Country by Smith Burnham and Theodore Henley Jack 1934

Further reading
Theodore Henley Jack : a portrait by Roberta D. Cornelius

References

External links

1881 births
1964 deaths
Randolph–Macon College faculty
Heads of universities and colleges in the United States
People from Greensboro, Alabama
Writers from Lynchburg, Virginia
University of Alabama alumni
Tulane University alumni
University of Chicago alumni
Southern University faculty
University of Chicago faculty
Emory University faculty
American university and college faculty deans
20th-century American biographers
20th-century American academics